The discography of Sick Puppies, an Australian hard rock band, consists of five studio albums, six extended plays, 16 music videos and 15 singles.

Albums

Studio albums

Live albums

Extended plays

Singles

Promotional singles

Music videos

Other appearances

Notes

References

Discographies of Australian artists
Rock music group discographies